Alejandro Galván Garza (27 September 1955 – 22 November 2006) was a Mexican politician affiliated with the PAN. He briefly served as Senator of the LX Legislature of the Mexican Congress representing Tamaulipas.

References

1955 births
2006 deaths
Politicians from Linares, Nuevo León
Members of the Senate of the Republic (Mexico)
National Action Party (Mexico) politicians
21st-century Mexican politicians
Monterrey Institute of Technology and Higher Education alumni